Look Out for Number One (#1) or Looking Out for Number One (#1) may refer to:

Music
 "Lookin' Out for #1" (Bachman–Turner Overdrive song), 1976
 "Looking Out for Number One" (Travis Tritt song), 1993
 "Looking Out for Number One" (Laura Branigan song), 1981
 "Lookin' Out for Number One", a song by Cheap Trick on the 1982 album One on One
 "Lookin' Out for Number One", a song by Honeymoon Suite on the 1988 album Racing After Midnight
 "Looking Out For Number One", a song by Dwarves on the album The Dwarves Are Born Again
 "Looking Out For #1", a song by Bamboo on the 2008 album Tomorrow Becomes Yesterday
 "Looking Out for #1", a song by Guttermouth on the 2002 album Gusto
 "Looking Out for Number One", a 1980 single by Mariska Veres

 Look Out for #1, a 1976 album by Brothers Johnson
 "Look Out for Number One", a song by Tommy Faragher on the soundtrack for the 1983 film Staying Alive

Film, television, and radio
 "Looking Out for Number One", an episode from the fourth season of Ellen
 "Look Out for Number One", an episode from the sixth season of Orange Is the New Black
 "Looking Out For #1", an episode of the radio series Under the Influence

Literature
 Looking Out for #1, a 1978 book by Robert Ringer
 Looking Out for Number One, a 1989 autobiography by Dave Semenko

See also

 Number One (disambiguation)
 Lookout (disambiguation)
 Look Out (disambiguation)